Have Doughnut was the name of a Defense Intelligence Agency project whose purpose was to evaluate and exploit a MiG-21 "Fishbed-E" that the United States Air Force acquired in 1967 from Israel. Israel acquired the aircraft as the result of its Operation Diamond when, on August 16, 1966, Iraqi Air Force pilot Capt. Munir Redfa, in a defection pre-arranged by the Israeli Mossad intelligence agency, flew it to Israel during a training flight.

In this multi-service project, Air Force and United States Navy pilots evaluated the MiG-21, redesignated as the "YF-110", in a variety of situations. The project's name came from the "doughnut" shaped sight reticle on the F-4 Phantom's canopy used to aim at opposing aircraft. The inability of the Navy to disseminate the results of this highly classified project to combat pilots was part of the impetus to create the United States Navy Fighter Weapons School (TOPGUN). The HAVE DOUGHNUT tests were conducted at Groom Lake, commonly known by the public as "Area 51." A similar project occurred a year later known as HAVE DRILL, which used a MiG-17 Fresco acquired in the same manner.

Notes and references

United States naval aviation
United States intelligence operations
Non-combat military operations involving the United States
Israel–United States military relations